Cacochloris is a genus of moths in the family Geometridae. The genus was first described by Prout in 1912.

Species
Cacochloris ochrea Warren, 1897
Cacochloris uvidula Swinhoe, 1885

References

Geometrinae